Music Voyager is the debut studio album by Singaporean singer JJ Lin, released on 10 April 2003 by Ocean Butterflies.

Track listing

References

2003 debut albums
JJ Lin albums